Dionysios Vasilopoulos (1902–1964) was a Greek swimmer. He competed in the water polo at the 1920 Summer Olympics and the 1924 Summer Olympics and in three swimming events at the 1924 Summer Olympics. He competed for Al-Iskanderiya in Egypt and AOPF of Palaio Faliro in Greece.

References

External links
 

1902 births
1964 deaths
Greek male swimmers
Greek male water polo players
Egyptian male swimmers
Egyptian male water polo players
Olympic swimmers of Greece
Olympic water polo players of Greece
Swimmers at the 1924 Summer Olympics
Water polo players at the 1920 Summer Olympics
Water polo players at the 1924 Summer Olympics
Sportspeople from Alexandria
Egyptian people of Greek descent
Egyptian emigrants to Greece